Sukholozhsky District is an administrative district (raion), one of the thirty in Sverdlovsk Oblast, Russia. As a municipal division, it is incorporated as Sukhoy Log Urban Okrug. Its administrative center is the town of Sukhoy Log. Population (excluding the administrative center): 14,451 (2010 Census);

References

Notes

Sources

Districts of Sverdlovsk Oblast